The Crew is an online-only racing video game co-developed by Ivory Tower and Ubisoft Reflections and published by Ubisoft. It released for Microsoft Windows, PlayStation 4 and Xbox One, with an Xbox 360 port developed by Asobo Studio in December 2014, and for Amazon Luna in November 2020. It features a persistent open world environment for free-roaming across a scaled-down recreation of the Contiguous United States and includes both role-playing and large-scale multiplayer elements.

The Crew received a mixed reception upon release. Critics praised the game's world design but criticized the always-online aspect, which created technical glitches and other issues, the difficult-to-understand user interface, and the presence of microtransactions. The game shipped two million copies by January 1, 2015. The first expansion, titled The Crew: Wild Run, was released on November 17, 2015. The second expansion, entitled The Crew: Calling All Units, was announced at Gamescom 2016 and released on November 29, 2016.

It was soon followed by its sequel, The Crew 2, which released worldwide on June 29, 2018. Another sequel, The Crew Motorfest, is currently under development and schduled to be release in 2023.

Gameplay
The Crew is a racing game set in a persistent open world environment for free-roaming across a scaled-down recreation of the contiguous United States. The map is split into five regions: The Midwest, East Coast, The South, Mountain States, and West Coast. Each region has its own unique geographical features. Six main cities (one in each region, two in the Midwest) are featured in the game: Detroit and Chicago in the Midwest, New York City on the East Coast, Miami in The South, Las Vegas in the Mountain States, and Los Angeles on the West Coast. Various other cities, namely St. Louis, Washington, D.C., New Orleans, Dallas, Salt Lake City, Santa Fe, San Francisco, and Seattle, are also featured in the game. Over thirty smaller cities and towns line the countryside, such as Nashville, Norfolk and others. It takes approximately 45 minutes in real time to drive from coast to coast in-game.

The Single-player campaign is up to 20 hours long, and entails infiltrating criminal groups with protagonist Alex Taylor (Troy Baker). Players can also participate in mini-games called skills challenges that are peppered across the world. They are triggered when a player drives through them and  involve completing challenges such as weaving through gates and staying as close to a racing line as possible for a period of time. Players' scores are automatically saved so friends can try and beat their scores, in similar fashion to how Autolog works in games of the Need for Speed franchise. Missions can be played alone, with friends, or with online co-op matchmaking. The multiplayer mode lets a maximum of eight players to compete in races and other gametypes. There are no in-game loading screens or pauses. Players can also build cars with a tie-in app for iOS and Android.

The Crew creative director Julian Gerighty has called the game a role-playing game with large-scale multiplayer elements. The multiplayer is not separate from the single-player. Players can form "crews" to race together or against ghost records.

The game requires a constant internet connection to play.

Plot

The story begins with main character Alex Taylor (Troy Baker) being pursued by local law enforcement near Detroit. After losing the cops, he finds a Chevrolet Camaro loaned to him by his friend and father figure, Harry (Charles Parnell). Harry explains to him that Alex's older brother and the founder of the 5-10 motor club, Dayton (Travis Willingham), wants to speak with him. Dayton arrives and orders Alex to drive him to Ambassador Bridge. Once there, Dayton tells him to keep his head down. A Ford GT pulls up, Dayton goes and talks with the driver before walking back to the Camaro, but before he can get there, the driver shoots him and drives off. Alex rushes to Dayton's side as the police arrives to arrest him. Dayton succumbs to his wound, while Alex is charged and later convicted of murder by FBI Special Agent Bill Coburn (D.C. Douglas).

Five years later, Alex, now in prison, encounters FBI Agent Zoe Winters (Amy Rosoff) who informs him that he will be temporarily released if he agrees to cooperate with the FBI in exposing Coburn's corruption, and finding the truth behind Dayton's murder, which has been committed by the new leader of the 5-10s, Dennis "Shiv" Jefferson (Jason Spisak). In doing so, Alex has to infiltrate the 5-10 and climb up its hierarchy, named after V engines, with Shiv being labeled as the “V8” (King V/Big Block/Big Eight). Other ranks included the starting rank of “Chauffeur”, the “V2” (V-twin), the “V4” (Four Block/Four Banger), and the “V6” (Hard Six).

After getting released from prison, Alex accepts his first mission to help the Detroit 5-10 lieutenant Troy (Joel Steingold). After doing several missions for him, Alex is sent to St. Louis to kill that city's V2. Alex and Zoe fake the V2's death, but Troy finds out that she is still alive, and manages to kill her himself. Alex then gets a call from Herschel Craig (Johnny Hawkes), the Chicago 5-10 and Troy's rival. Craig asks Alex for help to claim territory from Troy. Alex is able to get his 5-10 ink by helping Craig recover a stolen car from Europe. Alex is sent to New York City soon after to help a V6, Shiv's childhood friend, Eric Tsu (Vic Chao).

Alex goes to New York and is reunited with Harry, who agrees to help him. Alex gets an off-road vehicle and meets Eric, racing him and later doing missions for him. Meanwhile, Zoe and Alex are suspicious of Harry when he gets secretive. As it turns out, car shipments for the 5-10s went missing, and Harry had been behind them. It is later revealed that Harry is helping Dayton's girlfriend, Connie, and her five-year-old son, Ben, by stealing a proper escape vehicle to escape the city from the 5-10s after hearing about Dayton's death. Alex also has to do a delivery for a mysterious person, later revealed to be Coburn. Harry has Alex follow him with Connie and Ben in the car so they can escape the city. Alex gets his V2 ink, and is asked to go to Miami.

Alex goes to Miami and meets Alita (Cyrina Fiallo), Shiv's ex-girlfriend. After winning a race against her crew, and later Alita herself, Alex is tasked with claiming The South from Cameron “Cam” Rockport, who has been killing various 5-10s to stay in power. Coburn, using a voice scrambler, then calls Alex for help in taking down Shiv. After winning the South from Cam in a race, Alex notices Coburn's plan of killing Cam, and is forced to go to Miami Beach to save Cam. Cam catches up on Alex's plan to take down Shiv, causing Cam to come to the support of Alex. Afterwards, Shiv notices Alex's activities and gives him the V4 ink. Alex is then sent to Las Vegas.

Alex goes to a diner and meets Roxanne (Tonantzin Carmelo), a technology whiz whose missing sister, Daria, joined the 5-10s. After several missions, including one revealing that Daria had been killed by Shiv, Zoe finds out that Coburn is selling impounded contraband. She then orders Alex to travel to Death Valley to collect evidence against Coburn. After collecting sufficient evidence, Coburn eventually shows up. Alex proceeds to chase Coburn down across Las Vegas, and they end up in an airport, where Zoe arrests the corrupt FBI agent for a slew of charges, including his involvement with Dayton's murder. With Coburn finished, Alex gets a call from Shiv saying he is invited as a V6 to "The 5-10 Face-Off" on the West Coast.

Alex goes to Los Angeles and meets Vincent (John Paul Pitoc), a former pro racer. Vincent agrees to help Alex, but Shiv has rigged the events against Alex. First, during a race at Mazda Raceway Laguna Seca, he calls the police to arrest Alex. Later, in a race in the Yosemite National Park, Alex is forced to race in a car that isn't as fast as the others' cars. However, Alex overcomes all these odds and manages to win. Shiv discovers Alex's desire of vengeance, and sends his henchmen to go after Alex. Alex escapes and goes to Shiv's victory party with the intent of assassinating him, but Alex realizes that the people he met on his mission are his new family, and refuses to do so. He suggests to settle it in a race instead. Alex wins, but Shiv refuses to give up and the police arrives to arrest Shiv in which he pins the blame on Alex and says he will kill him for selling him out, leading Alex to chase him down along the coast.

At the end of the game, Shiv is confronted by the police as his car is totaled. In the subsequent epilogue, Alex explains his love for racing as he is named the new V8.

Development
The Ivory Tower development team includes former Eden Games employees, and is receiving assistance from Ubisoft Reflections. The game plans to use the new consoles' social and cooperative play features. On 13 August 2014, Ubisoft confirmed that the game will be released on the Xbox 360 the same date as the other versions, with Asobo Studio leading the development and Ivory Tower, Ubisoft Reflections and Ubisoft Shanghai providing support.

The Crew used Dunia as its video game engine modified with Ivory Tower's proprietary tools.

On 21 July 2014, Ubisoft released a closed beta of The Crew on the PC for a limited time only. The beta allowed players to play a portion of the story-driven missions in the Midwest and East Coast and free roam the entire United States of America at their own pace. Cars and a variety of other things such as driver levels and specifications for cars were limited. The second closed beta for PC took place from 25 to 29 August 2014. A PlayStation 4 and Xbox One console beta was released on 30 September 2014. Another closed beta for PlayStation 4 and Xbox One took place on 6 to 10 November 2014. An open beta for Xbox Live and PlayStation Network members also took place from 25 to 27 November 2014. As part of UBI30, a promotion which would bring seven Ubisoft free games to PC in 2016 as part of Ubisoft's 30th anniversary, the game was free to download from Uplay from September 14 to mid-October 2016, while the Xbox One version was made available free to Xbox Live Gold subscribers as part of Microsoft's Games with Gold program from June 16 to July 15, 2016.

The soundtrack for The Crew was composed by Joseph Trapanese. The track "Heavy As a Feather" was used in the official launch trailer for The Crew.

The Crew: Wild Run 
The Crew: Wild Run is the first expansion pack to the 2014 game. It is developed by Ivory Tower and published by Ubisoft for Microsoft Windows, PlayStation 4 and Xbox One. The expansion was announced at E3 2015 during Ubisoft's press conference. It was released on November 17, 2015.

Adding to the base gameplay, the expansion introduces motorcycles and a range of new cars, and new vehicle specifications such as monster trucks, drift cars, and dragsters, as well as a new multiplayer event, The Summit. In addition, the release of the expansion introduces a graphical overhaul for the game, via an update available to all players whether or not they own the expansion.

The Crew: Calling All Units 
The Crew: Calling All Units is the second expansion pack to the 2014 game. It was announced at Gamescom 2016 and was released on November 29, 2016, for Microsoft Windows, PlayStation 4 and Xbox One alongside the Ultimate Edition, which bundles the base game, all the previously released downloadable content, and both Calling All Units and Wild Run expansions.

In Calling All Units, the player is given the opportunity to play as a police officer and must arrest illegal streetracers and smugglers. They will gain access to police equipment as well as various types of cars, to catch suspects.

Reception

The Crew received mixed reviews from critics. Critics overall praised the game's immense world, but disliked the game's technical issues relating to its online-only gameplay, as well as its complicated user interface and use of microtransactions. Aggregating review websites GameRankings and Metacritic gave the Microsoft Windows version 72% based on 7 reviews and 71/100 based on 12 reviews, the Xbox One version 60% based on 14 reviews and 64/100 based on 18 reviews and the PlayStation 4 version 59% based on 37 reviews and 61/100 based on 60 reviews.

Mike Channell from Eurogamer gave the game an 8/10, praising its rich content, worthy side-missions and activities, enormous driveable space, successful blend between the story and the multiplayer, huge variety of scenery and rewarding and entertaining co-operative gameplay, but criticizing its poor story and lead character,  "outrageous" AI, as well as the inclusion of microtransactions. He stated that "The Crew is an astonishing achievement, not only because of its vastness but also its level of fidelity and the authenticity of its character."

Matthew Kato from Game Informer gave the game a 7/10, praising the satisfying upgrade and car-purchasing system, as well as the decent voice-acting. However, he criticized the clichéd story and stated that "The Crew feels like an average arcade racer. There are some fun times, but you may be surprised to discover that America is a pretty empty place."

Josh Harmon from Electronic Gaming Monthly gave the game a 6/10, praising the game world, which he stated "has captured the spirit of America" and described the game as "the best open world in a racing game to date". However, he criticized the off-putting microtransactions, as well as poor story-telling and the pay-to-win model of the game. He stated that "Despite delivering an impressive playground, The Crew struggles to build out a worthwhile game experience around it."

Peter Brown from GameSpot gave the game a 5/10, also praising the massive game world, as well as the single-player mission, but criticizing the automatically activated missions, frustrating side-missions, such as the raid car missions and the fleeing missions, as well as outdated graphics, poor physics, AI and user interface, texture pop-in and disappointing cars, buildings and environment models. He also criticized the game for not encouraging players to form a crew to play missions. He summarized the review by saying that "The Crew isn't that good after all. When you can't play due to server issues, you find a new game to play and leave The Crew in your dust."

The Crew has shipped 2 million copies as of January 1, 2015. In May 2016, Ivory Tower announced that the game has been played by more than 5 million players.

Sequels 
In May 2017, Ubisoft announced its sequel, The Crew 2. It was scheduled to be released worldwide in early 2018 for Microsoft Windows, PlayStation 4 and Xbox One. In the sequel, the roster of vehicles expands to include planes, boats, motorcycles and police cars. The game was released on June 29, 2018.

In late January 2023, Ubisoft announced its other sequel, The Crew Motorfest. It scheduled to be released in 2023 for Windows, PlayStation 4, PlayStation 5, Xbox One, and Xbox Series X/S. Unlike the two previous The Crew games, Motorfest would set in a scaled-down recreation of the Hawaiian island of Oahu.

References

Notes

External links

 

2014 video games
Multiplayer and single-player video games
Open-world video games
Organized crime video games
Persistent worlds
PlayStation 4 games
Racing video games
Video games scored by Joseph Trapanese
Racing video games set in the United States
Street racing video games
Ubisoft franchises
Ubisoft games
Windows games
Xbox 360 games
Xbox One games
Video games about police officers
Video games developed in France
Video games using Havok
Asobo Studio games